Solen Public School District 3 is a school district headquartered in Solen, North Dakota.

It operates Cannon Ball Elementary School (K-8) in Cannon Ball and Solen High School in Solen.

Within Sioux County it serves Solen and almost all of Cannon Ball. The district also extends into Morton County.

History
In July 2013 Justin Fryer was named the superintendent of the district.

In 2018 the Cannon Ball elementary building had a lack of insulation and bug infestation issues. That year the school district received a $5 million federal grant to rebuild the school.

In 2019 the State Auditor of North Dakota took over an audit that a private company was doing of the district to check if embezzlement has occurred. The state believed that $38,000 was stolen from the district.

References

External links
 Solen Public School District 3
School districts in North Dakota
Education in Sioux County, North Dakota
Education in Morton County, North Dakota